A wiki wiki dollar was a giveaway promotion in the United States from the Chevron gasoline company during the 1960s.  The advertising campaign featured a wiki wiki girl, played by dancer Irene Tsu, dressed in a grass skirt and performing a brisk hula while standing on a gasoline pump.

The National Petroleum News noted it was one of the many promotional gimmicks attempted by gasoline companies in the 1960s and described it as part of "a late Sixties West Coast duel" between Chevron and Shell:

Chevron paid game players "Wiki Wiki Dollars" of $1 to $2,500 for matching segments of game pieces and offered more than $2,300,000 in prizes as part of a "hula" bingo game.

The Hawaiian use of the word "wiki" was the local pronunciation of the word "quickly" spoken to them by missionaries trying to get their flocks to work more to Western timeframes than the more laid back Hawaiian work ethic of getting it done in plenty of time. Quickly became Wikly became "wiki."

In the San Francisco Express Times in 1969, editor Marvin Garson denounced the campaign as part of an article on Standard Oil, the corporate predecessor of Chevron.  He wrote:

Standard debauches the public taste with its garish $2,300,000 hula-hula Wiki Wiki Dollar giveaway. Standard strangles the beauty of the American road.

References

Further reading
An E-bay sale of a photo of Irene Tsu says "Irene Tsu (born April 5, 1943 in Shanghai, China) is an actress who started in the film Flower Drum Song in 1961. She was featured in an advertising campaign (Wiki wiki dollar) in the 1960s. She was raised in San Francisco and won a "Miss Chinatown" beauty pageant in 1961."
Star Trek: The Episode Guide says (quoting IMDB) Irene Tsu "was the TV spokeswoman for "Chevron Island" Standard Oil"
A blog entry says "I found the debate when I Googled Wiki Wiki Girl (no quotes, shoulda had 'em) to see if anyone remembers that phrase.  In the late '60's or early '70's, Chevron had an advertising campaign with the "Wiki Wiki Girl"—a gorgeous pseudo-Polynesian woman in a grass skirt hula-ing her butt off on top of a gas pump.  There may have been a contest involved.  I remember it only because 10 years later, I had my first full-time job working for the Wiki Wiki Girl herself, Irene Tsu, former dancer and now fashion designer.  I got the job because I knew her husband, photographer/director Ivan Nagy."

Sales promotion